Kureh Zar (also Romanized as Kūreh Zār; also known as Kūreh Dar) is a village in Enaj Rural District, Qareh Chay District, Khondab County, Markazi Province, Iran. At the 2006 census, its population was 662, in 152 families.

References 

Populated places in Khondab County